Veľké Úľany is a large village and municipality in Galanta District of  the Trnava Region of south-west Slovakia.

Geography
The municipality lies at an elevation of 123 metres and covers an area of 14.856 km². The village is located around 12 km west of Galanta.

Parts of the village 
 Lencsehely
 Nové Osady
 Ekoosada

Street names 
 Bágrová
 Hlavná
 Kaplnská
 Kováčska
 Kpt. Nálepku
 Jazerná
 Mlynská
 Leninová
 Júliusa Fučíka
 Krížná
 Piesková
 Robotnícka
 Školská
 Štefana Majora
 Zoltána Fábryho
 Záhradnícka
 Úzka
 Sadová
 Nová

History
In historical records the village was first mentioned in 1221 as Fudemus. After the Austro-Hungarian army disintegrated in November 1918, Czechoslovak troops occupied the area, later acknowledged internationally by the Treaty of Trianon. Between 1938 and 1945 Veľké Úľany once more  became part of Miklós Horthy's Hungary through the First Vienna Award. From 1945 until the Velvet Divorce, it was part of Czechoslovakia. Since then it has been part of Slovakia.

Population
It has a population of about 4,500 people, in majority ethnic Hungarians.

References

External links
https://web.archive.org/web/20070513023228/http://www.statistics.sk/mosmis/eng/run.html
https://www.ulany.sk

Villages and municipalities in Galanta District